Minaya is a municipality in Albacete, Castile-La Mancha, Spain.

References

Municipalities of the Province of Albacete